CFPX-FM is a First Nations community radio station that operates at 98.3 FM in Pukatawagan, Manitoba.

Owned by Missinnippi River Communications, the station was given approval by the CRTC on January 16, 1996.

References

External links

Fpx
Fpx
Radio stations established in 1996
1996 establishments in Manitoba